The 2020 Copa del Rey de Baloncesto was the 84th edition of the Spanish King's Basketball Cup. It was managed by the ACB and was held in Málaga, in the Martín Carpena in February 2020.

All times are in Central European Time (UTC+01:00).

Qualified teams
The top seven ranking teams after the first half of the 2019–20 ACB regular season and Unicaja, as host team, qualified for the cup.

Draw
The 2020 Copa del Rey de Baloncesto was drawn on 13 January 2020. The seeded teams were paired in the quarterfinals with the non-seeded teams. There were not any restrictions for the draw of the semifinals. As in recent seasons, the first qualified team plays its quarterfinal game on Thursday.

Bracket

Quarterfinals

Barça vs. Valencia Basket

Real Madrid vs. RETAbet Bilbao Basket

Iberostar Tenerife vs. MoraBanc Andorra

Unicaja vs. Casademont Zaragoza

Semifinals

Valencia Basket vs. Real Madrid

MoraBanc Andorra  vs. Unicaja

Final

References

External links
Copa del Rey official website

Copa del Rey de Baloncesto
2019–20 in Spanish basketball
February 2020 sports events in Spain
2020 in Spanish sport